Valery Panayotovich Kerdemelidi (born 18 July 1938) is a retired artistic gymnast from Russia. He competed at the 1960 Summer Olympics in all artistic gymnastics events and won a silver medal in the team allround competition. Individually his best result was ninth place on the rings and horizontal bar.

During his career he won two national titles, on the horizontal bar (1965) and allround (1962). He won two silver team allround medals at the world championships (1962, 1966), as well as five medals at the European championships in 1963.

He graduated from an institute of physical education and after retirement worked as a gymnastics coach, becoming the head coach of the Central Soviet Army Club (CSKA) in 1971. He is an international referee and in the 1990s was a member of the technical commission of the European gymnastics federation. For his coaching achievements he was awarded the Order For Merit to the Fatherland of 2nd class.

References

1938 births
Living people
Soviet male artistic gymnasts
Russian people of Greek descent
Gymnasts at the 1960 Summer Olympics
Olympic gymnasts of the Soviet Union
Olympic silver medalists for the Soviet Union
Olympic medalists in gymnastics
Medalists at the 1960 Summer Olympics
Medalists at the World Artistic Gymnastics Championships